Maratha town is a census town in Panipat district in the Indian state of Haryana.

Demographics
 India census, Panipat  had a population of  ------- . Males constitute 55% of the population and females 45%. Panipat has an average literacy rate of 51%, lower than the national average of 59.5%: male literacy is 60%, and female literacy is 40%. In Panipat, 1

7% of the population is under 6 years of age. It is biggest exporter of cotton fabrics, curtains etc.

References

Cities and towns in Panipat district